The Vineeta Foundation was founded in 1995 by Vineeta Rastogi. She and her husband, Brian Hennessey, learned that Ms. Rastogi had terminal cancer in the same year and decided to start a foundation to continue her public health and human rights work, with a particular focus on HIV/AIDS pandemic.

Part of the foundation's innovative work involves extensive overland travel to discover the health and human rights issues in a region, seeking formal and informal organizations that are successfully dealing with these problems and their cultural context. The foundation then implements a pilot program involving as many of these players as possible and then presents the findings at the International AIDS Conference.

The foundation is chaired by Radia Daoussi, a Fulbright Scholar and Bill and Melinda Gates Foundation Scholar trained at Johns Hopkins School of Public Health.

References

External links 

 Official website

HIV/AIDS organizations in the United States
Medical and health foundations in the United States
International organizations based in the United States